Africallagma elongatum is a species of damselfly in the family Coenagrionidae. It is known by the common name elongate bluet. It is found in Ethiopia, Kenya, Uganda, Rwanda and northern Tanzania; it is most common in highlands. Its natural habitats include tropical swamps, reedy streams, pools and lake shores.

Taxonomy
Although it has been lumped with Africallagma fractum, most authorities now recognize both taxa as valid species.

References

Coenagrionidae
Odonata of Africa
Insects described in 1907
Taxonomy articles created by Polbot